Hypodactylus latens is a species of frog in the family Strabomantidae. It is endemic to the Cordillera Central of Colombia, and is known from the Antioquia, Caldas, Quindío, and Tolima Departments.
It occurs on fallen leaves and grass roots. It is a rare species, although its cryptic habits might contribute to this impression. It is threatened by habitat loss (deforestation).

References

latens
Amphibians of the Andes
Amphibians of Colombia
Endemic fauna of Colombia
Taxonomy articles created by Polbot
Amphibians described in 1989